is a passenger railway station in located in the city of  Tsu, Mie Prefecture, Japan, operated by Central Japan Railway Company (JR Tōkai).

Lines
Akogi Station is served by the Kisei Main Line, and is 19.3 rail kilometers from the terminus of the line at Kameyama Station.

Station layout
The station consists of a single side platform and a single island platform connected by a footbridge.

Platforms

Adjacent stations

History

The Sangū Railway started operating between Tsu Station and Miyagawa Station on December 31, 1893. The line was nationalized on October 1, 1907, becoming the Sangu Line of the Japanese Government Railways (JGR) on October 12, 1909. The station was transferred to the control of the Japanese National Railways (JNR) Kisei Main Line on July 15, 1959. The station has been unattended since December 21, 1983. The station was absorbed into the JR Central network upon the privatization of JNR on April 1, 1987.

Passenger statistics
In fiscal 2019, the station was used by an average of 344 passengers daily (boarding passengers only).

Surrounding area
Tsukyujo Park
Maruyama Inari Shrine
Tsuhashi Minami Post Office
Mie Prefectural Tsu Technical High School
Mie Prefectural Mie Yume Gakuen High School

See also
 List of railway stations in Japan

References

External links

Railway stations in Japan opened in 1893
Railway stations in Mie Prefecture
Tsu, Mie